The HIW Canadian Tag Team Championship was a professional wrestling tag team championship in the professional wrestling promotion, High Impact Wrestling. The championship was established on June 8, 2005 when Dylan Robson and Screaming Eagle defeated Antonio Scorpio Jr. and Curtis Knievel.  On February 22, 2018; Los Rudos unveiled new title belts at Destruction Theory in Saskatoon, Saskatchewan.  The titles became deactivated on October 25, 2019 after HIW's last show Monster Brawl VI as the company ceased operations.  Canadian Wrestling's Elite acquired all of HIW's assets.

Title history

Names

Reigns

|-

|}

Combined reigns

By team

By wrestler

References

Canadian Tag
Tag team wrestling championships
Canadian professional wrestling championships